FAMEL - Fabrica de Produtos Metalicos Lda, was one of the largest Portuguese moped manufacturers between 1960s and 1980s.

Based in Águeda, the company was set up in the second half of the 1940s by three partners with the aim of producing moped and bicycle rims. In 1952, it decided to diversify its activities into the manufacture of mopeds. Until its closure, in 1994, it manufactured over 30 models using engines from various third parties, including Pachancho, Alpino, Rex, Veloce, Mota, Jlo, Dkw and, mostly, Zündapp. Its first model, the Utilitária, with a 2 speed Pachancho engine, dates from 1952 whereas the last one, the Famel Electric (an electrical scooter) dates from 1994. Its first big market success was the Foguete, a tubular craddle moped with a Jlo 3 speed engine launched in 1957 which was quite good looking at the time and which came out when Famel's main competitor, Cruzador, was stuck with quite old dated models. When two years later, in 1959, Cruzador launched a totally new model, the Andorinha Asa d'Ouro, with a Sachs 3 speed engine, the Foguete lost a lot of its shine and its production was discontinued shortly after. Famel's most popular model was the XF-17, launched in 1975. and sold until the company went bankrupt in 1994. As the increased purchasing power in their home country Portugal made automobiles more and more popular, the moped market became smaller and the strong competition from European and Japanese imported models forced bankruptcy.

Their last product, the Famel Electric, or Electron, was the world's first electric scooter. It was developed in 1993. with Portuguese technology in partnership with EFACEC. 
The entire (small) production was sold to La Poste before FAMEL stopped production. The following year, Peugeot presented their Scoot'elec based on the same technology.

After stopping production in 1994 due to financial problem, Famel was declared bankruptcy in 2002. In 2014  it announced a revitalization programme and a future prototype but these never materialized.

References

External links 
 Famel on the Portuguese Motorcycle Database

Motorcycle manufacturers of Portugal
Defunct companies of Portugal